Die Natürlichen Pflanzenfamilien (1887–1915) by Adolf Engler (1844–1930) and Karl Anton Prantl is a complete revision of plant families down to generic level and often even further. As such it forms part of the Engler system of plant taxonomy.

Engler's starting point was that of Eichler who had been the first to use phylogenetic principles, and reflected the new post-Darwinian perspective, although Engler himself did not think that his was.  His modified Eichler schema first appeared in 1886 in his Guide to Breslau Botanic Garden (of which he was the director).

Die Natürlichen Pflanzenfamilien appeared in 23 volumes. An incomplete second edition was issued in 28 parts (1924-1980), although Engler had died in 1930. It is still considered one of the few true World Floras.

First edition (1887–1915)
The complete 23 volume work was published in four parts (Teil), together with supplements and indices. The volumes are arranged as follows:

 Teil (section) 1:
 Abt. 1, 1897; Myxothallophyta (Abt. I): Myxomycetes. Euthallophyta (Abt. II): Fungi (Eumycetes): Phycomycetes & Ascomycetes.
 Abt. 1*, 1907; Euthallophyta (Abt. II): Eumycetes: Lichenes. 
 Abt. 1**, 1900; Euthallophyta (Abt. II): Eumycetes: Basidiomycetes & Fungi imperfecti.
 Abt. 1a, 1900; Euthallophyta (Abt. II): Schyzophyta & Flagellata. 
 Abt. 1b, 1896; Euthallophyta (Abt. II): Peridiniales (Gymnodiniaceae, Prorocentraceae, Peridiniaceae) and Bacillariaceae.
 Abt. 2, 1897; Euthallophyta (Abt. II): Euphyceae.
 Abt. 3, Hälfte 1, 1909; Embryophyta zoidiogama (Abt. III): Hepaticae & Musci.
 Abt. 3, Hälfte 2, 1909; Embryophyta zoidiogama (Abt. III): Musci.
 Abt. 4 1902; Embryophyta asiphonogama (Abt. III): Pteridophyta.
 Teil 2:
 Abt. 1, 1889; Embroyophyta siphonogama (Abt. IV): Gymnospermae & Angiospermae (Monocotyledoneae: Thyphaceae etc.).
 Abt. 2, 1887; Monocotyledoneae: Gramineae & Cyperaceae.
 Abt. 3, 1889; Monocotyledoneae: Palmae etc.
 Abt. 4, 1888; Monocotyledoneae: Flagellariaceae etc.
 Abt. 5, 1888; Monocotyledoneae: Juncaceae etc.
 Abt. 6, 1889; Monocotyledoneae: Musaceae etc.
 Teil 3:
 Abt. 1, 1889; Dicotyledonae: Saururaceae etc.
 Abt. 1a, 1893; Dicotyledoneae: Polygonaceae etc.
 Abt. 1b, 1889; Dicotyledoneae: Phytolaccaceae etc.
 Abt. 2, 1891; Dicotyledoneae: Nymphaeaceae etc.
 Abt. 2a, 1891; Dicotyledoneae: Podostomataceae etc.
 Abt. 3. 1894; Dicotyledoneae: Rosaceae etc.
 Abt. 4, 1896; Dicotyledoneae: Geraniaceae etc.
 Abt. 5, 1896; Dicotyledoneae: Euphorbiaceae etc.
 Abt. 6, 1895; Dicotyledoneae: Elaeocarpaceae etc.
 Abt. 6a, 1894; Dicotyledoneae: Flacourtiaceae etc. (Index 6–8 p. 272)
 Abt. 7, 1893; Dicotyledoneae: Lythraceae etc.
 Abt. 8, 1894; Dicotyledoneae: Araliaceae etc.
 Teil 4: 
 Abt. 1, 1897; Dicotyledoneae: Clethraceae etc.
 Abt. 2, 1895; Dicotyledoneae: Oleaceae etc.
 Abt. 3a, 1897; Dicotyledoneae: Convolvulaceae etc.
 Abt. 3b, 1895; Dicotyledoneae: Nolanaceae etc.
 Abt. 4, 1891; Dicotyledoneae: Rubiaceae etc.
 Abt. 5, 1894; Dicotyledoneae: Cucurbitaceae etc.
 Nachträge (supplements)
 Teil 1, Abt. 2, Nachträge, 1911
 Teilen 2–4, Nachträge 1, 1897
 Teilen 2–4, Nachträge 2, 1900
 Teilen 2–4, Nachträge 3 (or Ergänzungshefte 2), 1908
 Teilen 2–4, Nachträge 4 (or Ergänzungshefte 3), 1915
 Gesamtregister (index)
 Teil 1, Gesamtregister,  1909.
 Teil 2–4, Gesamtregister, 1899.

Synopsis 

The major groupings (Abteilung, Unterabteilung), with selected lower rankings are shown here with [Volume number] and page number. N (Nachträge = supplement).
 Abteilung Myxothallophyta (Myxomycetes) [I (1)] 1897
 Abteilung Euthallophyta
 Unterabteilung Fungi (Eumycetes)
 Unterabteilung Schizophyta [I (1a)] 1900
 Klasse Schizomycetes (Bacteria)
 Klasse Schizophyceae (Myxophycaceae)  p. 45
 Klasse Flagellata p. 93
 Unterklasse Peridiniales [I (1b)] p. 1
 Unterklasse Bacillariales (Diatomeae)  p. 34
 Fam. Bacillariaceae
 Unterabteilung Euphyceae (Algae) [I (2)]
 Klasse Conjugatae
 Klasse Chlorophyceae
 Klasse Characeae
 Klasse Phaeophyceae (Fucoideae)
 Klasse Dictyotales
 Klasse Rhodophyceae
 Abteilung Embryophyta Zoidiogama (Archegoniatae) (later Embryophyta Asiphonogama) [I (3)] 1909
 Unterabteilung Bryophyta (Muscinei)
 Klasse Hepaticae p. 1
 Klasse Musci p. 142
 Unterabteilung Pteridophyta [I (4)] 1902
 Abteilung Embryophyta Siphonogama [II (1)] 1889
 Unterabteilung Gymnospermae [II(1)] p. 6
 Unterabteilung Angiospermae [II (1)] p. 128
 Klasse Monocotyledoneae p. 183 [II–III]
 Fam. Gramineae [II (2)] p. 1
 Fam. Palmae [II(3)] p. 1
 Fam. Flagellariaceae [II(4)] p. 1
 Fam. Juncaceae II(5) p. 1 1888
 Fam. Liliaceae pp. 10–91 12 subfamilies
 Melanthioideae
 Herrerioideae
 Asphodeloideae
 Allioideae
 Lilioideae p. 60 2 tribes
 Tulipeae p. 60
 Scilleae p. 63
 Dracaenoideae
 Asparagoideae
 Ophiopogonoideae
 Fam. Haemodoraceae p. 92
 Fam. Amaryllidaceae Pax [II(5)] pp. 97–124 4 subfamilies
 Amaryllidoideae p. 103
 Agavoideae p. 115
 Hypoxidoideae p. 119
 Campynematoideae p. 124
 Fam. Musaceae [II (6)] p. 1  1889
 Fam. Saururaceae [III (1)] p. 1  1889
 Klasse Dicotyledoneae [IV] 1897
 Unterklasse Archichlamydeae [III] (6) p. 1
 Fam. Elaeocarpaceae p. 1
 ...
 Fam. Violaceae p. 322
 Fam. Flacourtiaceae (6a) p. 1
 ...
 Fam. Elaeagnaceae p. 246
Index to Teil I (6a) 
Index to Teil 2–IV
Index to II(5)

Second edition 1924– 
 Bd. 1b: Schizophyta. Klasse Schizophyceae. 1942 (reprint 1959) 
 Bd. 2: Peridineae (Dinoflagellatae) - Diatomeae (Bacillariophyta) - Myxomycetes. 1928
 E. Lindemann, Peridineae - G. Karsten, Bacillariophyta (Diatomeae) - E. Jahn, Myxomycetes
 Bd. 3: Chlorophyceae (nebst Conjugatae, Heterocontae und Charophyta). 1927 (reprint 1959)
 Bd. 5a: I: Eumycetes: Allgemeiner Teil: Bau, Entwicklung und Lebensweise der Pilze. 1943 (reprint 1959)
 Bd. 5b. 8: Eumycecetes (Fungi) – Klasse: Ascomycetes, Reihe Euascales, Unterreihe VIII: Tuberineae. 1938
 Bd. 6: Eumycetes (Fungi): Basidiomycetes. 1928
 P. Dietel, 1. Unterklasse: Hemibasidii - S. Killermann, 2. Unterklasse: Eubasidii, Reihe Hymenomyceteae
 Bd. 7a: Eumycetes (Fungi) – Klasse: Basidiomycetes. 1933 (reprint 1959)
 Bd. 8: Lichenes (Flechten). 1926
 M. Fünfstück, A. Allgemeiner Teil - A. Zahlbruckner, B. Spezieller Teil: Ascolichenes (Schlauchflechten); Hymenolichenes (Basidiomycetenflechten)
 Bd. 10-11: Embryophyta zoidiogama (Archegoniatae): Musci (Laubmoose), Hälfte 1–2. 1924-
 Bd. 10: Musci (Laubmoose), 1. Hälfte. 1924 (reprint 1960)
 W. Ruhland, Musci, Allgemeiner Teil - W. Ruhland, I. Unterklasse Sphagnales: Allgemeine Verhältnisse - H. Paul, Sphagnaceae (Torfmoose) - W. Ruhland, II. Unterklasse Andreaeales: Allgemeine Verhältnisse - V. F. Brotherus, Andreaeaceae - W. Ruhland, III. Unterklasse Bryales: I. Allgemeine Verhältnisse - V. F. Brotherus, II. Spezieller Teil - 1. Reihengruppe Eubryinales; 1. Reihe Fissidentales, 2. Reihe Dicranales, 3. Reihe Pottiales, 4. Reihe Grimmiales, 5. Reihe Funariales, 6. Reihe Schistostegiales, 7. Reihe Tetraphidales, 8. Reihe Eubryales
 Bd. 11: Musci (Laubmoose), 2. Hälfte. 1925 (reprint 1960)
 Bd. 13: Embryophyta siphonogama: Gymnospermae. 1926 (reprint 1960) 
 W. Gothan, Cycadofilices - R. Pilger, Cycadales - R. Kräusel, Fossile Cycadaceae, Bennettitales - R. Pilger, Ginkgoales - R. Kräusel, Fossile Ginkgoaceae, Cordaitales - R. Pilger, Coniferae - A. Engler, Geographische Verbreitung der Coniferae - R. Kräusel, Fossile Coniferae - F. Markgraf, Gnetales
 Bd. 14a-20d: Embryophyta siphonogama: Angiospermae. 1926-1959
 Bd. 14a: Angiospermae: Kurze Erläuterung der Blüten- und Fortpflanzungsverhältnisse. 1926
 Bd. 14d: Angiospermae: Reihe Graminales (Glumiflorae). Gramineae II. 1956
 Unterfamilien: Micrairoideae, Eragrostoideae, Oryzoideae, Olyroideae  
 Bd. 14e: Gramineae III. 1956–1960 
 Bd. 15a: Angiospermae: Reihen Farinosae, Liliiflorae, Scitamineae. 1930
 A. Engler, Flagellariaceae, Cyanastraceae - C. Gilg-Benedict, Restionaceae, Centrolepidaceae - R. Pilger, Mayacaceae, Thurniaceae, Rapateaceae, Philydraceae - G. O. A. Malme, Xyridaceae - W. Ruhland, Eriocaulaceae - H. Harms, Bromeliaceae - G. Brückner, Commelinaceae - O. Schwartz, Pontederiaceae - F. Vierhapper, Juncaceae - K. Krause, Stemonaceae, Liliaceae - F. Pax, Haemodoraceae, Amaryllidaceae - F. Pax / K. Hoffmann, Velloziaceae, Taccaceae - R. Knuth, Dioscoreaceae - L. Diels, Iridaceae - H. Winkler, Musaceae, Cannaceae - T. Loesener, Zingiberaceae, Marantaceae
 Bd. 16b: Angiospermae: Reihen Santalales, Aristolochiales, Balanophorales. 1935 (reprint 1960)
 Bd. 16c: Angiospermae: Reihe Centrospermae. 1934 (reprint 1960)
 H. Schinz, Amaranthaceae - A. Heimerl, Nyctaginaceae - A. Heimerl, Phytolaccaceae - A. Heimerl, Gyrostemonaceae - A. Heimerl, Achatocarpaceae - F. Pax / K. Hoffmann, Aizoaceae - F. Pax / K. Hoffmann, Portulacaceae - E. Ulbrich, Basellaceae - F. Pax / K. Hoffmann, Dysphaniaceae; Caryophyllaceae - J. Mattfeld, Nachtrag zu den Caryophyllaceae - E. Ulbrich, Thelygonaceae - E. Ulbrich, Chenopodiaceae
 Bd. 17a: II: Angiospermae: Reihe Magnoliales. (2. Teil). 1959
 Bd. 17a: IV: Angiospermae: Reihen Rhoeadales und Sarraceniales: Ordnung Ranunculales, Fam. Ranunculaceae 1995
 Bd. 17b: Angiospermae: Reihen Rhoeadales und Sarraceniales: Reihen Rhoeadales und Sarraceniales. 1936 (reprint 1960)
 F. Fedde, Papaveraceae - F. Pax / K. Hoffmann, Capparidaceae, Tovariaceae - O. E. Schulz, Cruciferae - F. Bolle, Resedaceae - F. Pax, Moringaceae, Bretschneideraceae - J. C. T. Uphof, Sarraceniaceae - H. Harms, Nepenthaceae - L. Diels, Droseraceae
 Bd. 18a: Angiospermae: Reihe Podostemonales – Reihe Rosales, Unterreihe Saxifragineae. 1930
 A. Engler, Podostemonaceae - L. Diels, Cephalotaceae - A. Engler, Saxifragaceae, Brunelliaceae, Cunoniaceae - F. Niedenzu / A. Engler, Myrothamnaceae - E. Pritzel, Pittosporaceae - L. Diels, Byblidaceae - F. Niedenzu / H. Harms, Bruniaceae - H. Harms, Hamamelidaceae - L. Diels, Roridulaceae - H. Harms, Eucommiaceae - A. Berger, Crassulaceae
 Bd. 19a: Angiospermae: Reihe Pandales – Reihe Geraniales, Unterreihe Geraniineae (erster Teil). 1931
 Bd. 19b: I: Angiospermae, Reihe Geraniales, Unterreihe Geraniineae (2. Teil) 1960
 Bd. 19c: Angiospermae: Reihe Geraniales, Unterreihen Dichapetalineae, Tricoccae, Callitrichineae. 1931
 Bd. 20b: Angiospermae: Reihe Sapindales, Unterreihen Celastrineae und Icacinineae. 1942 (reprint 1960)
 Bd. 20d: Angiospermae, Reihe Rhamnales. 1953
 Bd. 21: Embryophyta siphonogama: Angiospermae, Dicotyledoneae, Archichlamydeae. 1925, reprint 1960
 Parietales und Opuntiales.
 E. Gilg / E. Werdermann, Dilleniaceae - E. Gilg / E. Werdermann, Actinidiaceae - E. Gilg, Eucryphiaceae - E. Gilg, Ochnaceae - R. Pilger, Caryocaraceae - E. Gilg / E. Werdermann, Marcgraviaceae - A. Engler, Quiinaceae - H. Melchior, Theaceae - A. Engler, Guttiferae - E. Gilg, Dipterocarpaceae - F. Niedenzu, Elatinaceae - F. Niedenzu, Frankeniaceae - F. Niedenzu, Tamaricaceae - E. Janchen, Cistaceae - R. Pilger, Bixaceae - F. Pilger, Cochlospermaceae - E. Gilg, Canellaceae - H. Melchior, Violaceae - W. Becker, Viola - E. Gilg, Flacourtiaceae - E. Gilg, Stachyuraceae - E. Gilg, Turneraceae - H. Harms, Malesherbiaceae - H. Harms, Passifloraceae - H. Harms, Achariaceae - H. Harms, Caricaceae - E. Gilg, Loasaceae - E. Gilg, Datiscaceae - E. Irmscher, Begoniaceae - E. Gilg, Ancistrocladaceae - F. Vaupel, Cactaceae
 Bd. 28b: I: Angiospermae: Ordnung Gentianales, Fam. Loganiaceae 1980
For comparative indices between the first and second editions (Parts 1–24), see Morley 1984.

References

Bibliography

Works by Engler

Other 
 
 
 
 

Botany books